Sarrant is a commune in the Gers department in southwestern France.

Geography

History
The Philip IV of France (1268 –1314), better known as the Fair or Iron King, set up a charter of customs, which protected the inhabitants and set the living rules in the village community. The charter dated 1265, specified the rights and duties of the residents and the co-lords. According to the charter, consuls headed the royal castrum (fortified camp, rectangular in plan) of Sarrant and not the local Lords.

Structure
The houses of Sarrant create a ring around the central church of the village. This is not a common layout for a Bastide, because in general they were commercial enterprises and the market square was the central element of the village. There are many medieval and half-timbered houses in this village.

Population

See also
Communes of the Gers department

References

Communes of Gers
Plus Beaux Villages de France